William Greenough Thayer (24 December 1863 – 27 November 1934) was an American educator, headmaster of St. Mark's School from 1894 to 1930.

Early life
Thayer was born in New Brighton, Staten Island, New York, the son of Robert Helyer Thayer, a hardware merchant and ship chandler, and Hannah Appleton.

After graduating from Amherst College in 1885, he attended the Union Theological Seminary and Episcopal Theological School (Cambridge), he was ordained an Episcopal minister.

Career
Thayer taught at Groton School, from  1889–1894, before being appointed headmaster of St. Mark's School, a post he held for 36 years until 1930.  During this period, Thayer made numerous improvements to the school and its reputation rose to be amongst the most prominent private schools in the country.

Eight or ten times in the school year, Thayer would leave school to marry his alumni.  From the Time article: Imposing is his Record at Socialite Weddings, for Loyal St. Mark's Grooms will have no other Cleric.

He was known by staff and students as "Twill".

Personal life
His wife was Violet Otis (17 January 1871 – 16 November 1962), daughter of William C. and Margaret (Sigourney) Otis of Boston.

They married in Boston on 1 June 1891.  They had five sons and two daughters:

 Sigourney Thayer 1896-1944
 Robert H. Thayer 1901-1984
 John Otis Thayer (died 1988)

External links
  Time article on his retirement in 1930
 The Rev. William Greenough Thayer | Rectors and Vicars | Parish History | St. Andrew's Episcopal Church - Ayer, Massachusetts at www.standrewsayer.org Biography

1863 births
1934 deaths
Amherst College alumni
People from Staten Island
Thayer family
Educators from New York City